The Saratoga Derby Invitational Stakes is an American Grade I stakes race Thoroughbred horse race for three-year-olds run over a distance of one and three-sixteenths miles on the turf held annually in August at Saratoga Race Course in Saratoga Springs, New York. The purse for the event is US$1,000,000.

History

First years
The inaugural running of the event known as the Saratoga Derby was on 13 August 1904 run as the fourth race on the day's card over a distance of  miles on the dirt track. The event was won by James R. Keene's 1904 Belmont Stakes winner Delhi starting as 2/9 odds-on favorite who led from start to finish in a small three horse field defeating the entry of Stalwart and St. Valentine in a time of 2:13. 
The second running was won by the Cairngorm who earlier in the spring had won the 1905 Preakness Stakes which was held at Gravesend Race Track. The event only attracted four runners but the winning margin was a close neck in a time of 2:18 flat. 
The third and last running in 1906 was won by the favorite Accountant who defeated Gallavant and McKittredge. At that time the event was richer than the Travers Stakes and Accountant was the top stakes earner for the year with $81,925 for owner Diamond Jim Brady.

The entrance into the event, with additional declaration fees needed to be paid when horses were still two-year-olds was a burden which curtailed the number of horses that would start in the event. The event was not held after 1906.

Renewal
In 2019 the New York Racing Association with the influx of racino dollars created a new racing series for turf horses called the Turf Trinity. The Saratoga Derby Invitational Stakes was positioned as the second leg of the new three race series with the first running on 21 July 2019 over a distance of  miles with an impressive purse of US$1 million. In 2020 due to the COVID-19 pandemic in the United States, NYRA cut the purse to $500,000 meeting. The other events of the Turf Trinity are the Belmont Derby and the Jockey Club Derby at Belmont Park.

For 2021 the Thoroughbred Owners and Breeders Association's American Graded Stakes Committee upgraded the classification of the event to the highest status of Grade I. The 2021 winner, the Irish-bred State Of Rest confirmed the high classification of the event by later in the year travelling to Australia and winning the Group 1 Weight for age W. S. Cox Plate and the following year winning the Group 1 Prince of Wales's Stakes at Royal Ascot.

Records
Speed record:
 miles: 1:52.02  	A Thread of Blue    (2019)

Margins:
 lengths – Nations Pride (IRE) (2022)

Most wins by an owner:
 No owner has won the event more than once

Most wins by a jockey:
 No jockey has won the event more than once

Most wins by a trainer:
 No trainer has won the event more than once

Winners 

Legend:

See also
 List of American and Canadian Graded races

References

Graded stakes races in the United States
Grade 1 stakes races in the United States
2019 establishments in New York (state)
1904 establishments in New York (state)
1907 disestablishments in New York (state)
Horse races in New York (state)
Turf races in the United States
Recurring sporting events established in 2019
Saratoga Race Course
Flat horse races for three-year-olds